Jean-Baptiste Gobelet (born 13 March 1983) is a French rugby union player. He currently plays for Stade Français in the Top 14. His usual position is on the wing but he can also play at centre. He previously played for Biarritz Olympique, whilst there he won two Top 14 titles.

Gobelet was signed to the San Diego Breakers PRO Rugby team in early 2016.

Awards 
 Top 14 (2005 and 2006)
 Runner-up 2009–10 Heineken Cup with Biarritz Olympique in defeat against Stade Toulousain (21–19)
 Runner-up 2005–06 Heineken Cup with Biarritz Olympique in defeat against Munster Rugby (23–19)

External links
 
 ERC stats

1982 births
French rugby union players
Living people
People from Tulle
San Diego Breakers players
Sportspeople from Corrèze
Rugby union flankers